Broad Peak is one of the Eight-thousander peak located in the Karakoram range of Gilgit-Baltistan, Pakistan and Xinjiang, China, the twelfth-highest mountain in the world at  above sea level. It was first ascended in June 1957 by Fritz Wintersteller, Marcus Schmuck, Kurt Diemberger, and Hermann Buhl of an Austrian expedition.

Geography
Broad Peak is part of the Gasherbrum massif in Baltistan on the border of Pakistan and China.

The mountain has five summits: Broad Peak (8051 m), Rocky Summit (8028 m), Broad Peak Central (8011 m), Broad Peak North (7490 m), and Kharut Kangri (6942 m).

Etymology
The literal translation of "Broad Peak" to Falchan Kangri is not used among the Balti people. The English name was introduced in 1892 by the British explorer Martin Conway, in reference to the similarly named Breithorn in the Alps.

Climbing history 
The first ascent of Broad Peak was made between June 8 and 9, 1957 by Fritz Wintersteller, Marcus Schmuck, Kurt Diemberger, and Hermann Buhl of an Austrian expedition led by Marcus Schmuck. A first attempt by the team was made on May 29 where Fritz Wintersteller and Kurt Diemberger reached the forepeak (8,030 m). This was also accomplished without the aid of supplemental oxygen, high altitude porters or base camp support.

In July 2007 an Austrian mountaineering team climbed Broad Peak and retrieved the corpse of Markus Kronthaler, who had died on the mountain one year before, from over 8,000 metres.

In 2008 French mountaineer Élisabeth Revol made solo ascents of Broad Peak, Gasherbrum I and Gasherbrum II within 16 days and without the aid of supplemental oxygen.

In the winter and summer of 2009 there were no summits. There was one winter expedition by a Polish-Canadian team. In the summer there was one fatality, Cristina Castagna.

In summer 2012, five members of "Koroška 8000", a Slovenian team led by Gregor Lačen, summitted the mountain without supplementary oxygen or high-altitude porters. They established a route in deep snow from Camp 4 to the summit, used by seven additional climbers from other expeditions. All summitted on July 31, 2012.

On March 5, 2013 Maciej Berbeka, Adam Bielecki, Tomasz Kowalski and Artur Małek made the first winter ascent. Broad Peak was the twelfth Eight-thousander summited in wintertime and the tenth Eight-thousander first summitted in winter by Polish climbers.
During the descent, Maciej Berbeka and Tomasz Kowalski did not reach Camp 4 (at 7400 m) and were pronounced missing. On March 7, the head of the expedition Krzysztof Wielicki, said there are "no chances at all" of finding alive 58-year-old Maciej Berbeka and 27-year-old Tomasz Kowalski.
On March 8 both climbers were declared dead and the expedition was ended.

In July 2013, a group of five Iranian climbers attempted to ascend through a new route from the southwestern face. Three of them — Aidin Bozorgi, Pouya Keivan, and Mojtaba Jarahi — ascended successfully but during descent all three of them were lost and declared dead.

On July 23, 2016, Frenchman Antoine Girard's paraglider flight over Broad Peak was the first time a paraglider had flown above an 8,000-metre summit.

On July 14, 2019, 17-year-old Shehroze Kashif from Pakistan became the youngest ever to summit this peak.

Timeline 
1954 First attempt by Dr. Karl Herrligkoffer of Germany on the SW side that failed due to a storm and extreme cold.
1957 First ascent by an Austrian expedition.
1983 First ascent by a woman, Krystyna Palmowska.
1984 First one-day ascent of an 8000-meter peak (solo) by Krzysztof Wielicki in 21.5 hours.
1992 On August 4, Enric Dalmau Ferré, Òscar Cadiach, Alberto Soncini and Lluís Ràfols were the first to reach the summit from the Chinese side.
1994 On July 9, Carlos Carsolio reached the summit, establishing a new solo route now known as Route Carsolio.
1997 On July 7, Anatoli Boukreev achieved a solo ascent.
2013 On March 5, first winter ascent by Polish expedition.
 2013 July,  Aidin Bozorgi, Pouya Keivan, and Mojtaba Jarahi of Iran ascended through a new route, named Route Iran.
2014 Hunza Expedition to Broad Peak made the summit on 23 July 2014, Karim Hayat reached to main summit and Naseer Uddin turned back from Rocky summit. Karim Hayat became the first person from his village who reached 8000 m.
2019 July 14, Shehroze Kashif at the age of 17 became the youngest ever to summit this peak. He also became the youngest Pakistani to reach this altitude.

Passes 
Windy Gap is a -high mountain pass  at east of K2, north of Broad Peak, and south of Skyang Kangri.

See also 
List of mountains in Pakistan
Highest Mountains of the World
List of Austrian mountaineers

References

Further reading 
Richard Sale, Broad Peak, 2004. English published by Carreg Ltd in the UK. 
 Marcus Schmuck, Broad Peak 8047m Meine Bergfahrten mit Hermann Buhl, 1958. German published by Verlag "Das Bergland-buch" in Salzburg/Stuttgart.
 Kurt Diemberger, Spirits of the Air, 1994.  Mountaineers Books, 
 Hermann Buhl, Achttausand: Druber und Drunter, 1955, Munchen.  Afterword by Kurt Diemberger describes the Broad Peak expedition.
Zvezdnate noči (Starry Nights) by Dušan Jelinčič, 
 Anna Czerwińska Broad Peak'83 tylko dwie (Broad Peak'83 only two) "Sport i Turystyka", Warszawa 1989, 
 Jacek Hugo-Bader, Długi film o miłości. Powrót na Broad Peak, Polish published by Znak, Cracow 2014,

External links 

Broad Peak on Himalaya-Info.org (German)
Broad Peak on Summitpost
First Ascent: The official Website of the Austrian OEAV Karakoram expedition 1957 on BroadPeak.org
 Virtual Aerial Video of Broad Peak

Eight-thousanders of the Karakoram
Mountains of Gilgit-Baltistan
Mountains of Xinjiang
China–Pakistan border
International mountains of Asia
Broad Peak